is a Japanese manga series written and illustrated by Etsumi Haruki. It was serialized by Futabasha in Manga Action between 1978 and 1997 and collected in 67 bound volumes, making it the 45th longest manga released. Jarinko Chie received the 1981 Shogakukan Manga Award for general manga.

Jarinko Chie was adapted twice, first as an anime theatrical film produced by Tokyo Movie Shinsha and Toho and directed by Isao Takahata, which premiered in Japan on April 11, 1981. This was followed by a 64-episode anime television series also produced by Tokyo Movie Shinsha, which was broadcast in Japan between October 3, 1981, and March 25, 1983. A sequel anime television series with 39 episodes followed on October 19, 1991, to September 22, 1992.

The official English title of the anime is Downtown Story.

Characters

Chie Takemoto
A girl with a short temper.

Tetsu Takemoto
Chie's father. He is a mostly unemployed gambler and tough guy.

Kotetsu
Chie's pet cat. His trademark is a moon on the forehead.

Video games
None of the video games were released outside Japan.

References

External links
  at Futabasha 
  
 

1978 manga
1981 anime television series debuts
1983 Japanese television series endings
1991 anime television series debuts
Futabasha manga
Mainichi Broadcasting System original programming
Manga adapted into films
Seinen manga
Television shows set in Osaka
TMS Entertainment
Winners of the Shogakukan Manga Award for general manga